The Serie B 1948–49 was the seventeenth tournament of this competition played in Italy since its creation.

Teams
Salernitana, Alessandria, Vicenza and Napoli had been relegated from Serie A.

Events
Pre-war regulations were restored.

Final classification

Results

Relegation tie-breaker
Played in Milan on July 10:

Parma relegated to Serie C.

References and sourcesAlmanacco Illustrato del Calcio - La Storia 1898–2004'', Panini Edizioni, Modena, September 2005

Serie B seasons
2
Italy